Jinx (born 1953) was a chimpanzee who performed as part of the ice skating duo "Darlene and Jinx" with Darlene Sellek, his owner and trainer.

Early life
Jinx – a member of the pan troglodytes species – was born in late 1953 in Africa, near Léopoldville, the capital of Belgian Congo). Jinx was purchased for $600 (f.o.b. Africa) from a Miami pet shop when he was 2 months old. “We had no idea of going into show business.  We just wanted a pet,” claimed Darlene Sellek in an interview during one of the act's Ice Capades appearances in 1957.

Performing career
Jinx and Darlene first appeared as an act at “The Homecoming” in Dekalb, Illinois, in August, 1954, when Jinx was 10 months old. Jinx showed off his ability to walk a tightrope upside down and blindfolded. 4 months later, the act – billed as “Darlene and Jinx” – performed at the Chase Hotel in St. Louis, where the pair began a significant relationship with the major American circus impresario and director Al Dobritch.

In late January, Darlene started to train Jinx to ice skate, with the help of Baptist Schreiber, who is better known for his training of elephants. A few other show-business chimpanzees in the world were known to roller skate, but Jinx was the first to skate on ice. He first appeared on ice skates in the “Hollywood Ice Review” at Chicago Stadium in February, 1955, with the World and Olympic Ice Skating Champion Gundi Busch.

The relationship with Al Dobritch provided a number of bookings at various Shriner Circuses around the USA over the next few years, the first of which was the Zuhrah Shriner Circus in Minneapolis, at the end of February, 1955. The spring of 1955 found Darlene and Jinx in New Orleans at Pontchartrain Beach, working alongside Runyon and Edwards, and “Daddy Longlegs”, the man with the longest legs in the world.

By June, 1955, Al Dobritch had negotiated a television contract for the act; Darlene and Jinx had signed a 3-year contract with the Super Circus television show, produced in Chicago for station WBKB, “Chicago’s Family Station”.  While with Super Circus, Jinx worked with the children's television pioneer Claude Kirchner and the ever popular Mary Hartline.  Darlene and Jinx were forced to leave the show after only 5 months when the production moved from Chicago to New York in November, 1955.

Jinx visited New York for the first time in late 1955 when Darlene appeared on the What’s My Line? television game show (Game 2, Season 7, Episode 282), hosted by John Daly.  During that visit, Jinx was inducted into the American Airlines “Sky Cradle Club” for the flight from New York to Chicago in November, 1955.

In November, 1955, Jinx began regular appearances with Ned Locke on the Captain Hartz and His Pets television show produced in Chicago for television station WMAQ, sponsored by the Hartz Mountain Corporation pet care company.  (Jinx first appeared with Ned Locke as his WMAQ radio disc jockey assistant – the world's first chimpanzee radio personality.)

From the end on 1955 through mid-1956, Darlene and Jinx appeared at a number of Shriners Circuses across the US, including 
 the Rizpah Shrine Circus in Madisonville, Kentucky,  
 the Al Chymia Shrine Circus in Memphis, Tennessee 
 the Arabia Temple Shrine Circus in Houston, Texas,  
 the Shrine Circus in Topeka, Kansas, and  
 the Hamid Morton Shrine Circus at Hunt Armory in Bloomsbury, Pennsylvania.

In July, 1956, Darlene and Jinx appeared at Belmont Park, Montreal in Quebec.  This was followed in August at the Canadian National Exhibition (CNE) where they appeared with the television cowboy star Gene Autry, and then in September at the 4th annual Sudbury Rotary Exhibition in Sudbury, Ontario.

New Year, 1957, found Darlene and Jinx at Jack Valentine's Supper Club Restaurant in Ft. Lauderdale for a 3-month engagement with Jack Valentine's Ice Show.  Here he performed with the great figure skater Jack Paul, who is quoted saying “Jinx outdoes me in figure work”.

In March 1957, the duo appeared on the Jackie Gleason Show “Cavalcade of Circuses”.  In April, Darlene and Jinx made their first appearance in the Ice Capades at Chicago Stadium.   In July, they appeared in Las Vegas at The Sands Cirque Room and Hotel El Cortez “Rhythm On Ice Revue”.

Back in Chicago in January, 1958, Darlene and Jinx filled in for “The Three Adaros” at the American Electroplaters Society 46th Educational Session and Banquet and performed an act called “Hi Jinx” in the Merriel Abbott Ice Revue at Chicago Hilton.

Darlene and Jinx appeared on America's most popular television variety program of the era, The Ed Sullivan Show “John Harris’s Ice Capades Of 1958”, broadcast on CBS television from Madison Square Garden in New York City on Sunday, 7 September 1958.

Retirement
As Jinx aged, he began to become less controllable.  At a Christmas Show in New York in 1960, he exhibited greater aggression toward his young audience. 

Jinx's 1966 appearance in “Jamboree On Ice” at Indian Rocks Beach Palm Garden Restaurant, St. Petersburg, Florida, marked the end of his performing career.   He retired in 1967 to the St. Louis Zoo.

Co-stars 
 Gene Autry
 Professor Backwards
 Gundi Busch
 Leo Carrillo 
 Jill Corey
 John Daly
 Al Dobritch 
 Lola Dobritch
 Jack Entratter
 Georgia Gibbs
 Great Wallendas
 Mary Hartline
 Peter Lind Hayes
 Mary Healy
 Miss Ohio Joan Hyldoft
 Dennis James
 Emmett Kelly
 Claude Kirchner
 Ned Locke 
 Miller & Woodcock Elephants
 Garry Moore 
 Jane Morgan
 Hugh O'Brian 
 Joe Pasternak
 Johnnie Ray
 Duncan Renaldo 
 Bob Reynolds
 Sharon Kay Ritchie
 Adrian Swan
 Sophie Tucker

Performances

References 

The information contained in this entry was obtained from a scrap book of newspaper clippings collected by Darlene Nay (formerly Darlene Sellek) during Jinx's career as a performing artist.

External links

Individual chimpanzees
Duos